Unionville-Chadds Ford School District (UCFSD) is a school district in southeastern Chester County and western Delaware County, Pennsylvania, a  area encompassing seven townships and serving a total of abpproximately 4,000 students. 

The district is located in a fairly wealthy suburb of Philadelphia, the nation's sixth most-populous city, and Wilmington, Delaware. The district's budget, primarily obtained through property taxes, is approximately three times larger than the Pennsylvania average, at $53,902,000, equating to $12,877 spent by the district per student per year.

Schools 
Unionville High School
Charles F. Patton Middle School
Unionville Elementary School
Hillendale Elementary School
Pocopson Elementary School
Chadds Ford Elementary School

Demographics
White: 79.42%
Asian: 12.93%
Hispanic: 4.39%
Black: 0.72%
Native American: 0.05%

UCFSD has a significantly higher percent of White and Asian students and significantly lower percent of Black and Hispanic students than the Pennsylvania average.

Male: 50.8%
Female: 49.2%

District administration
The district's offices are located in Unionville High School in Kennett Square.  The current administration is as follows:

References

External links
 

School districts in Chester County, Pennsylvania
School districts in Delaware County, Pennsylvania